St. Clairsville High School is a public high school in St. Clairsville, Ohio, United States. It currently houses grades 9 through 12. Their nickname is the Red Devils, and they compete in the Ohio High School Athletic Association as a member of the Buckeye 8 Athletic League as well as the Ohio Valley Athletic Conference.

The Red Devil Football team went to the State Finals in 2012 and lost, 46-36, to Clinton-Massie. In 2016, the Red Devil boys track & field team won the school's first-ever OHSAA state title, narrowly defeating Lexington, 33-31.

Athletics

OHSAA state championships
 Boys Track and Field - 2016

OVAC 4A championships

Baseball - 1977, 1990, 1991, 1992, 1994, 1995, 1996, 2008, 2010, 2015, 2016, 2021
Boys Basketball - 2012, 2013
Girls Basketball - 1978, 1981, 2000, 2003, 2005, 2007
Cheering - 1998, 2004, 2006, 2008, 2009, 2010, 2011, 2012, 2013, 2014, 2015, 2016, 2017, 2018, 2019, 2020, 2021, 2022
Boys Cross Country - 2000, 2002, 2003, 2006, 2007, 2008, 2009, 2010, 2011, 2012, 2013
Girls Cross Country - 2007, 2008, 2009, 2010, 2011, 2012, 2016, 2017
Football - 1947, 1977, 1986, 1989, 1990, 2012, 2014, 2015
Golf - 1947, 1948, 1949, 1950, 1951, 1970, 1975, 1976, 1977, 1980, 1982, 1983, 1985, 1986, 1987, 1990, 1992, 1993, 1994, 1996, 1997, 2010, 2011, 2021
Boys Soccer - 2003, 2014, 2019, 2020
Girls Soccer - 1999, 2001, 2012, 2013
Softball - 1992, 1995, 2016
Boys Tennis - 1983, 1984
Boys Track - 1952, 1953, 1954, 1955, 1956, 1957, 1966, 1967, 1994, 2012, 2014, 2016, 2017
Girls Track - 1977, 1978, 1980, 1981, 1999, 2007, 2009, 2010, 2011, 2017
Volleyball - 1978, 1982, 1983, 1995, 2003, 2004, 2005, 2006, 2008
Wrestling - 1995, 2010
Boys Swimming - 2017
Girls Swimming - 2017, 2018, 2019, 2020, 2021

Buckeye 8 championships

Baseball - 2016
Boys Basketball - 2016
Girls Bowling - 2017
Golf - 2010, 2011, 2012, 2013, 2016
Boys Swimming - 2017
Girls Swimming - 2017
Boys Track and field - 2014, 2016, 2017

Notable alumni
Jim Bradshaw, former NFL safety for the Pittsburgh Steelers (1963-1967)

Footnotes

External links
http://www.stcs.k12.oh.us/

High schools in Belmont County, Ohio
Public high schools in Ohio